John Clerke  (born 1618) was an English politician who sat in the House of Commons  in 1640.

Clerke was the son of Henry Clerke of Rochester, Kent and his wife Grace Morgan, daughter of George Morgan of Crow Lane House Rochester. His father was a lawyer and MP for Rochester. He matriculated at University College, Oxford aged 16 on 16 September 1634.

In April 1640, Clerke was elected Member of Parliament for Rochester in the Short Parliament. Clerke's brother  Francis was also MP for Rochester.

References

1618 births
English MPs 1640 (April)
Year of death missing
Alumni of University College, Oxford
People from Rochester, Kent
Place of birth missing